The Saint-Paul River is a salmon river in the Côte-Nord region of Quebec, Canada. It empties into the Gulf of Saint Lawrence.

Location

The river rises on the height of land between the Atlantic and Saint Lawrence.
The river has a Strahler number of 7.
The last fifteen kilometers of its course define the boundary between  the cantons of Chevalier and Bonne-Esperance.
The mouth of the river is in the municipality of Bonne-Espérance in Le Golfe-du-Saint-Laurent Regional County Municipality.
The village of Rivière-Saint-Paul is located on the west side of its mouth.

Name

The Inuit who once lived at the river mouth called the river the Quitzezaqui River", meaning "Great River". 
The Naskapi call it Aisimeu Shipu, meaning "Eskimo River", while the Innu use Aiahtshimeu Hipu, also meaning "Eskimo River".
Louis Jolliet arrived at the river on 7 July 1694, and called it Rivière des Esquimaux.
It was also called Grande Rivière.
In March 1706 Jean-Amador Godefroy de Saint-Paul (1649-1730) was granted a trading concession at the river mouth, which was renamed the Rivière Saint-Paul.

Basin

It lies between the basins of the Napetipi River to the west and the Belles Amours River to the east.
About 69.5% of the basin is in Labrador, north of the provincial boundary.
The Quebec portion is partly in the unorganized territory of Petit-Mécatina and partly in the municipality of Bonne-Espérance.
The river basin include part of the proposed Basses Collines du Lac Guernesé Biodiversity Reserve.
A map of the ecological regions of Quebec shows the river in sub-regions 6o-T, 6n-T and 6m-S of the east spruce/moss subdomain.

Basque presence

Between July and August 2019 a team of underwater archaeologists discovered and examined four fishing sites on the Saint-Paul River that dated to the 16th century.
The camps were full of objects such as cauldrons, ceramics, roofing tiles and ships nails that the Inuit probably bought from Basques.
This showed that the Inuit were settled rather than nomadic, and also that the Basques had closer ties with the local people than had been thought.
The objects were found in the river and on the shore.

Fishing

The river is recognized as an Atlantic salmon (Salmo salar) river.
In 2018 harvesting of large salmon was allowed for only part of the year.
The fishing season lasts from mid-June to mid-August.
In 2013–2017 an average of 126 salmon were reported caught each year in the river.
The bed of the river is composed of medium-size rocks, and the water is cold and clear, making ideal habitat for Atlantic salmon.
Other species found at the river mouth include American eel (Anguilla rostrata), anadromous brook trout  (Salvelinus fontinalis) and rainbow smelt (Osmerus mordax'').

The Club de pêche au saumon Saint-Paul  (Saint-Paul Salmon Fishing Club) provides outfitting services.
They provides a cabin, canoe, and guided fly fishing and river fishing for Atlantic Salmon.
The camp is accessed via charter float plane or helicopter.
The service includes air transport from Blanc-Sablon, guided fishing and accommodation in camps on the river.

The river exceeded its target for salmon management in 2018, and in July 2018 the Ministry of Forests, Wildlife and Parks announced that in August anglers could keep their catch of one large salmon  or longer in the Gros Mécatina, Napetipi, Saint-Paul, Vieux Fort and Matapedia rivers.

Notes

Sources

Rivers of Côte-Nord